Scotlandshire is a term used to denote either the anglicisation of Scotland or the subordinate political relationship with England. It is recorded as early as 1706 in James Hodges' anti-Union Third Treatise.

By placing the suffix -shire after the country's name, the term attempts to parody the early modern tendency to place the word -shire after some ancient Scottish regions, as well as implicating in a tongue-in-cheek manner that Scotland has the status of an English county, rather than that of a distinct nation. Hence, the term is political in nature.

Several historic regions of Scotland have at times had the suffix -shire added when Scotland broadly adopted English-style county councils during the 19th century.

Argyll - Argyllshire
Bute (County of) - Buteshire
Fife - Fifeshire
Moray - Morayshire (or Elginshire)
Ross - Ross-shire
Sutherland - Sutherlandshire

Others have alternative names ending in -shire.
Angus - Forfarshire
East Lothian - Haddingtonshire
Midlothian - Edinburghshire
West Lothian - Linlithgowshire

See also
Scottish cultural cringe
Scottish national identity
Tartanry
North Briton

External links
 Lyrics of "Scotlandshire" - Jim Malcolm, archived from the original at http://www.jimmalcolm.com/html/main_cly3.htm

References

Cultural assimilation
Parodies
Political terminology
Scottish culture
Scottish society
England–Scotland relations